The Aichi E16A Zuiun (瑞雲 "Auspicious Cloud", Allied reporting name "Paul") was a two-seat reconnaissance seaplane operated by the Imperial Japanese Navy during World War II.

Design and development
The Aichi E16A originated from a 1939 specification for a replacement for the Aichi E13A, which at that time had yet to be accepted by the Imperial Japanese Navy Air Service (IJNAS). Disagreements about the requirements in the 14-Shi specification prevented most manufacturers from submitting designs, but in 1941 a new 16-Shi specification was drafted by the IJNAS around the Aichi AM-22 design which had already been made by Aichi engineers Kishiro Matsuo and Yasuhiro Ozawa.
The first AM-22, which first got the experimental designation Navy Experimental 16-Shi Reconnaissance Seaplane and later the short designation E16A1, was completed by May 1942 and was a conventional, low-wing monoplane equipped with two floats and had the unusual (for a seaplane) feature of being equipped with dive brakes, located in the front legs of the float struts, to allow it to operate in a secondary role as a dive bomber.

Variants

E16A1 Experimental Type 16 reconnaissance seaplane (16試水上偵察機, 16-Shi Suijō Teisatsuki)
Initial named Experimental Type 14 two-seat reconnaissance seaplane (14試2座水上偵察機, 14-Shi 2-Za Suijō Teisatsuki). 3 prototypes produced. Mounted  Mitsubishi MK8A Kinsei 51 engine, 2 × forward-firing 7.7 mm (.303in) Type 97 machine guns, 1 × rearward-firing 7.7 mm Type 92 machine gun.
E16A1 Zuiun Model 11 (瑞雲11型, Zuiun 11-gata)
General production model. Mounted  Mitsubishi MK8N Kinsei 54 engine, 2 × forward-firing 20 mm Type 99-2 cannons, 1 × rearward-firing 13 mm Type 2 machine gun.
E16A2 Provisional name Zuiun Model 12 (仮称瑞雲12型, Kashō Zuiun 12-gata)
Initial named Zuiun Model 22. Single prototype with a  Mitsubishi MK8P Kinsei 62 radial engine. One plane converted from E16A1, incomplete.

Operators

Imperial Japanese Navy Air Service
Naval vessel
Battleship Ise, supplied from 634th Kōkūtai.
Battleship Hyūga, supplied from 634th Kōkūtai.
Air unit
Kitaura Kōkutai
Yokosuka Kōkutai
634th Kōkutai
801st Kōkutai
301st Reconnaissance Hikōtai
302nd Reconnaissance Hikōtai

Specifications (E16A1 Zuiun Model 11)

See also

References
Notes

Bibliography

 Francillon, Ph.D., René J. Japanese Aircraft of the Pacific War. London: Putnam & Company Ltd., 1979. .
 Green, William. "Aichi E16A1 Zui-un (Paul)" War Planes of the Second World War, Volume Six: Floatplanes. London: Macdonald & Co.(Publishers) Ltd., 1962, pp. 116–118.
 Taylor, Michael J.H. Jane's Encyclopedia of Aviation. London: Studio Editions, 1989, p. 43.

Bunrindō (Japan)
Kōku-Fan Illustrated Special, Japanese Military Aircraft Illustrated Vol. 3 "Recinnaissance/Flying-boat/Trainer/Transport", January 1983
Famous Airplanes of the World No. 47 "Imperial Japanese Navy Reconnaissance Seaplane", July 1994

External links

E16A
1940s Japanese military reconnaissance aircraft
Floatplanes
Single-engined tractor aircraft
Low-wing aircraft
Aircraft first flown in 1942